Sal Abbatiello is an executive in the music business.

Abbatiello created and produced the freestyle, urban/dance-pop trio, The Cover Girls, whose hits include "Show Me" and "Wishing on a Star". Abbatiello is also the owner of Fever Records.

References

External links
Official Web Site

Living people
Year of birth missing (living people)
American music industry executives